Shrinjan Rajkumar Gohain (Rajkumar Shrinjan Singha; born 18 August 1990) is an Indian chess player. He is the former Indian chess champion and a Arena Grandmaster who has represented his state, Assam, and India in numerous tournaments.

Personal life 
Shrinjan Rajkumar Gohain was born in a Tai-Ahom family with his family residences at Guwahati, Moran in Dibrugarh District and Titabor in Jorhat District of Assam. His father's family can be traced back to Ahom Kingdom's royal family of Swargadeo Gadadhar Singha. Gohain is a direct descendant and sixth Great grandson of Ahom King Swargadeo Rajeswar Singha and Great great grandnephew of Swargadeo Purandar Singha.

Education 

Gohain attended Maria's Public School in Guwahati before moving to Bangalore to complete pre-university studies. He then went to St. Joseph's College of Commerce, Bangalore.

References

External links 
 

1990 births
Living people
Indian chess players
People from Guwahati